Gustaf Jacob Horn af Rantzien (1706–1756) was a Swedish baron. He was executed for treason as one of the conspirators participating in the failed coup d'etat of queen Louisa Ulrika, the Coup of 1756.

References

Sources
 Gustaf Jacob Horn i Svenskt biografiskt lexikon (artikel av Olof Jägerskiöld)

1706 births
1756 deaths
Executed Swedish people
People executed by Sweden by decapitation
18th-century Swedish people
18th-century executions by Sweden
People executed for treason against Sweden
Age of Liberty people
Swedish courtiers
18th-century Swedish criminals